Roslagen Marine Regiment (designation RMR, was a Swedish Navy coastal artillery unit which operated between from 1956 to 2000. The unit was based at Hamnholmen in Norrtälje Municipality.

History
Roslagen Marine Regiment was raised in 1956 as the 1st Coastal Artillery Brigade (Första kustartilleribrigaden, KAB 1). The brigade was then in the peace organization under the Vaxholm Coastal Artillery Regiment (KA 1), but was an independent unit in the war organization. The brigade consisted initially in the war organization of a staff at Hamnholmen and two barrier battalions (spärrbataljoner) based in Arholma and Söderarm as well as local defence battalions. In 1984, the brigade's war organization consisted of three barrier battalions, Roten, Arholma and Söderarm, and local defense battalions. On 1 July 1994, the brigade was also separated from the regiment in the peace organization and reorganized into the Roslagen Marine Brigade (Roslagens marinbrigad, RMB).

The big difference from 1994 was that the brigade was now called marine brigade. It was because the Swedish Navy's naval base service units merged with the coastal artillery's brigade service units and was now part of the marine brigades. This is a continuation of the integration of marine units on a lower level. On 1 January 1998, the war organization within the coastal artillery was reduced, whereby the Roslag Marine Brigade was reduced to a regiment, and received the new name Roslagen Marine Regiment (RMR). The regiment was disbanded on 30 June 2000 in connection with the Defence Act of 2000.

Units

1st Coastal Artillery Brigade (1956)
Staff at Hamnholmen
Barrier Battalion Arholma, with staff at Lidö
Barrier Battalion Söderarm, with staff at Hamnskär
2x bicycle infantry battalions
1st Archipelago Battalion of the Home Guard

1st Coastal Artillery Brigade (1984)
Staff at Hamnholmen
Barrier Battalion Roten, with staff at Singö
Barrier Battalion Arholma, with staff at Lidö
Barrier Battalion Söderarm, with staff at Hamnskär
1x defence district group staff type B
2x bicycle infantry battalions
1x division engineer company
1x howitzer company
defence district service company
security companies

Roslagen Marine Brigade (1994)
Staff at Hamnholmen
Coastal Defence Battalion Roten
Coastal Defence Battalion Söderarm
Coastal Defence Battalion Korsö
4th Amphibian Battalion
Marine Service Battalion Roslagen
Defence district battalion of the Stockholm Defence District (Fo 44)
Defence district engineer company, security companies and Home Guard units

Roslagen Marine Regiment (1998)
Staff
Marine Service Battalion Roslagen
Defence district battalion of the Stockholm Defence District (Fo 44)
Defence district engineer company, security companies and Home Guard units

Heraldry and traditions

Coat of arms
The coat of arms of the Roslagen Marine Brigade (RMB) 1994–1997 and Roslagen Marine Regiment (RMR) 1997–2000. Blazon: "Per pale or an inverted anchor sable and a zure an anchor surmounted two gunbarrels of older pattern in saltire, all or".

Heritage
On 1 July 2000, the Södertörn Group (Södertörnsgruppen) was raised, consisting of two battalions, Södertörn Home Guard Battalion and Roslagen Home Guard Battalion. Roslagen Home Guard Battalion was the traditional keeper of the Roslagen Marine Brigade.  In 2017 (or 2018), the traditions were transferred to the Södertörn Group, this after the decision that the Home Guard battalions should bear the insignia of the 1st Marine Regiment (Amf 1) as a unit insignia.

Commanding officers
1956–1994: ???
1994–1996: ???
1996–1997: COL Håkan Söderlindh
1998–2000: ???

Names, designations and locations

See also
Södertörn Marine Regiment
Vaxholm Coastal Artillery Regiment

Footnotes

References

Notes

Print

Web

Further reading

Regiments of the Swedish Amphibious Corps
Military units and formations established in 1956
Military units and formations disestablished in 2000
1956 establishments in Sweden
2000 disestablishments in Sweden
Vaxholm Garrison